Margaret Fernie Eaton (1871-1953) was an artist, born in England and schooled and worked as an artist in the United States. She created watercolor paintings in her early career, and is best known for her pyrographic works illustrations. She collaborated with her husband, fellow artist Hugh M. Eaton on book-plates and other works of art.

Early life

Margaret Fernie Eaton was born in Leamington, England on April 22, 1871. After she studied under J.B. Whitaker in Brooklyn, Eaton attended the Art Students League of New York. Her instructors there included Harry Siddons Mowbray and Kenyon Cox. She also attended Adelphi Academy.

Career
Watercolors she made by 1895 are  A Little Picture Book, The Clerk and The Story Book. In 1898, regarding her ability as a watercolor artist, it was said that she "had a rare talent for the human, and her socialistic studies like The China Painter and Left for Retrimming, show increasing power from year to year—both in sight and technic."

Eaton was known for her pyrography works of nude figures that resembled etchings. She is thought to be the first artist to use pyrography for magazine illustrations, like the Winter and March illustrations, and created book covers using pyrography. A noted work is a frieze, Song of the Sea. She and her husband, Hugh M. Eaton, collaborated on their work and shared their Brooklyn workplace, Valhall Studio. The designed book-plates, book binding, illuminations, etchings, and pyrographic works of art. They were also interested in photography. Hugh, who owned a printing press, published illustrations made by the himk and/or his wife. She created architectural panel designs like Song of Iris for a dining room, nursery, and Even-Song to be placed over a mantel. By 1901, she illustrated the story Bettina's Easter Stock and with her husband illustrated Hail and Farewell.

She was a member and vice-president of the Art Students League and a member of the New York Watercolor Club, and exhibited her works there. Both Margaret and Hugh were members of the Black and White Club.

Personal life
Margaret Fernie married Hugh M. Eaton (1865–1924). He graduated from the Polytech Institute and studied art in several places, including the Art Students League of New York.  He was art manager at Leslie's Weekly and The American Magazine. They lived at 339 Halsey Street in Brooklyn and operated a studio, Valhall Studio, with two of Hugh's sisters. He died on September 14, 1924.

She married Rev. Dr. Frederic W. Norris in Summerville, South Carolina at the St. Paul's Church on November 17, 1929. At that time, Norris was the rector emeritus of St. Matthew's Church in Brooklyn. Norris died on November 22, 1931.

Eaton died in 1953.

References

Further reading

External links

1871 births
Art Students League of New York alumni
People from Warwickshire (before 1974)
Artists from New York City
American people of English descent
British woodworkers
1953 deaths
Women woodworkers